Polygala hottentotta is a species of flowering plant in the milkwort family (Polygalaceae). It is native to South Africa, Namibia, Lesotho, Mozambique, Eswatini, and Zimbabwe.

References

hottentotta
Flora of Lesotho
Flora of Mozambique
Flora of Namibia
Flora of South Africa
Flora of Swaziland